Alioramini is a tribe of long-snouted tyrannosaurine tyrannosaurids from the Late Cretaceous epoch. It includes the tyrannosaurid genera Alioramus and Qianzhousaurus. Although tyrannosaurids are known from a variety of places around the globe, alioramins are currently restricted to Asia in mostly Maastrichtian strata.

Their snouts were much shallower and gracile than other tyrannosaurids, such as the massive Tarbosaurus or Tyrannosaurus. Most notably, their nasal bones were ornamented with a series of rugose, pointy bumps on its top surface.

The tribe Alioramini was first coined in 1995 by George Olshevsky only to contain the at-the-time uncertain Alioramus. In 2014 the tribe was formally defined as a clade-based branch containing all tyrannosaurids more related to Alioramus than to Albertosaurus, Proceratosaurus, and Tyrannosaurus. Hence, the tribe Alioramini consists of three species, namely Alioramus altai, Alioramus remotus, and Qianzhousaurus sinensis.

Alioramins were likely specialized in hunting small-sized prey with quick turns, as indicated by their relative gracile build and long snouts. Such feeding strategy may have avoided direct competition with other tyrannosaurids. The characteristic elongated snout morphology of alioramins was likely maintained throughout their ontogeny (growth), as opposed to large/robust tyrannosaurids, whose juveniles underwent drastic skull changes.

See also
 Timeline of tyrannosaur research

References

External links
 
 
 Skeletal reconstructions of Alioramus and Qianzhousaurus at Twitter

Tyrannosaurs
 
Maastrichtian extinctions